The Caldwell County Courthouse in Lenoir, North Carolina was designed by Wheeler & Runge in Classical Revival style.  It was built in 1905.

It was listed on the National Register of Historic Places in 1979.  The listing included one contributing building and two contributing objects.  It is located in the Lenoir Downtown Historic District.

References

County courthouses in North Carolina
Courthouses on the National Register of Historic Places in North Carolina
Neoclassical architecture in North Carolina
Government buildings completed in 1905
Buildings and structures in Caldwell County, North Carolina
National Register of Historic Places in Caldwell County, North Carolina
Historic district contributing properties in North Carolina
1905 establishments in North Carolina